Jream Baby Jream is the seventh studio album by Shit and Shine, released on 10 April 2012 by Riot Season.

Track listing

Personnel
Adapted from the Jream Baby Jream liner notes.
Shit and Shine
 Craig Clouse – vocals, instruments, cover art
Production and additional personnel
 Andrew Smith – design

Release history

References

External links 
 
 Jream Baby Jream at Bandcamp

2012 albums
Shit and Shine albums